Marios Kapsalis (born 6 September 1999) is a Greek professional footballer who plays as a right-back for Super League 2 club Chania.

References

1999 births
Living people
Greek footballers
Football League (Greece) players
Super League Greece 2 players
A.E. Karaiskakis F.C. players
O.F. Ierapetra F.C. players
AO Chania F.C. players
Association football defenders
Footballers from Arta, Greece
21st-century Greek people